Swords to Plowshares is a veterans organization that provides job training, housing, and benefits advocacy to low income and homeless U.S. military veterans.  Swords to Plowshares also operates a drop-in center for veterans requiring emergency services, and engages in policy work.  It is a 501(c)(3) non-profit organization headquartered in San Francisco, supported by governmental and private grants, as well as donations from individuals. Michael Blecker is the executive director.

Mission Statement 
War causes wounds and suffering that last beyond the battlefield. Swords to Plowshares’ mission is to heal the wounds of war, to restore dignity, hope, and self-sufficiency to all veterans in need, and to prevent and end homelessness and poverty among veterans.

History

1970s 
Swords to Plowshares was founded in 1974 by six veterans who had been assigned as VISTA volunteers to work in Bay Area Veterans Administration (VA) facilities.  They became concerned that the VA was not properly addressing the needs of returning Vietnam veterans.  Within four years, Swords to Plowshares became the first organization certified by the Veterans Administration to represent U.S. military veterans seeking compensation.

The organization began to raise awareness of, and advocate for, veterans suffering from Post Traumatic Stress Disorder PTSD and exposure to Agent Orange during the Vietnam War, resulting in Swords to Plowshares accepting a federal grant for veteran service agencies representing veterans who suffered health disorders as a consequence of Agent Orange exposure.

1980s 
Recognizing the over-representation of veterans among San Francisco's homeless population, Swords to Plowshares began to offer a transitional housing program in 1988.  This program became a model for transitional housing nationally.  During the same period of skyrocketing homelessness, Swords to Plowshares also began offering emergency housing, mental health treatment, and social service referrals through its "drop-in" center in downtown San Francisco.

1990s to present 
Swords to Plowshares continued to expand its veteran housing programs from 1998 to 2000 with the lease of a series of decommissioned military barracks in the San Francisco Presidio, which was termed "The Veterans Academy".  This permanent supportive housing facility currently serves more than 100 veterans, offering a variety of vocational training and residential programs.

Legal cases 

The Edgewood Arsenal case, VVA, et al. v. CIA, DOD, et al., is a class action lawsuit filed by Swords to Plowshares and Vietnam Veterans of California on behalf of veterans who were exposed to toxins, biological and nerve agents, and mind-altering drugs during military experiments that began in the 1950s.   The late Gordon Erspamer, senior litigation counsel in the San Francisco office of Morrison & Foerster, which is representing Swords to Plowshares and Vietnam Veterans of California's clients, alleged that US soldiers were, at the Edgewood facility northeast of Baltimore, Maryland, secretly subject to a series of CIA mind-control experiments related to those known as MKUltra.  The veterans "volunteered" for human experimentation programs but weren't informed of the nature of the experiments, weren't given the awards they were promised, and weren't properly cared for afterward.  The plaintiffs demand details of the experiments, the awards and follow-up health care they deserve; and for the government to supply details to the VA to support claims for their service-connected disabilities.

Programs & Services

Drop-in Center 
The Drop-in Center serves as the gateway to services for clients. The staff provide critical care to veterans in crisis and process clients to assess their needs and link them to the associated services.

Supportive Housing 
Swords to Plowshares has operated successful supportive housing programs for 25 years. The stabilization and supportive housing programs are core services to a continuum of care. Five permanent supportive housing and two stabilization housing programs meet the needs of veteran families, aging veterans and those with disabilities.

Legal Services 
Swords to Plowshares is accredited by the Department of Veterans Affairs as a qualified representative for veterans for VA benefits claims and appeals. The Legal Department assists and represents clients with service-connected disability compensation, non-service-connected pension, character of discharge applications for basic veteran eligibility, medical care entitlement, rating increases, and overpayment issues. It also provides assistance with discharge upgrade applications and requests for corrections to military records.

Employment & Training Services 
The Employment and Training staff work one-on-one with veterans to overcome barriers to employment, access job training, and connect with local employers.

Supportive Services for Veteran Families 
Supportive Services for Veteran Families is a VA-funded program that provides critical services and short-term financial support with move-in assistance, eviction prevention, housing location assistance, and a host of ancillary services. This program serves both individual veterans and veterans with families.

Income Support Services 
Income support and benefits assistance are part of the continuum of care to help veterans sustain long-term health, housing, and financial stability.

References

External links
 Homepage
  Department of Veterans Affairs website: list of veterans service organizations
 Swords to Plowshares Executive Director Michael Blecker's testimony before the House Committee on Veterans Affairs

American veterans' organizations
Political advocacy groups in the United States
1974 establishments in California
Organizations established in 1974
Organizations based in San Francisco
Project MKUltra